Orkhan Sadyar oghlu Sultanov (1977) is the Chief of the Foreign Intelligence Service of the Republic of Azerbaijan, colonel general.

Biography 
Orkhan Sultanov was born in 1977 in Baku. He previously worked at the Ministry of Foreign Affairs of Azerbaijan. In 2007–2011, he served as First Secretary for Humanitarian Affairs of the Azerbaijani Embassy in the United Kingdom. After the Ministry of Foreign Affairs, he worked at the Foreign Intelligence Department of the Ministry of National Security of Azerbaijan.

By the order of the President of the Republic of Azerbaijan dated 14 December 2015, Orkhan Sultanov was appointed Chief of the Foreign Intelligence Service of the Republic of Azerbaijan.

Awards and ranks

Ranks
 Major General — 17 March 2016
 Lieutenant General — 27 March 2019
 Colonel General — 7 December 2020

Awards 
 2nd degree "For service to the Fatherland" order — 26 March 2018
 "Zafar" order

References 

1977 births
Living people
Azerbaijani generals